Yukarıavlayan is a village in the Cumayeri District of Düzce Province in Turkey. Its population is 447 (2022).

References

Villages in Cumayeri District